In statistics, the Lehmann–Scheffé theorem is a prominent statement, tying together the ideas of completeness, sufficiency, uniqueness, and best unbiased estimation. The theorem states that any estimator which is unbiased for a given unknown quantity and that depends on the data only through a complete, sufficient statistic is the unique best unbiased estimator of that quantity. The Lehmann–Scheffé theorem is named after Erich Leo Lehmann and Henry Scheffé, given their two early papers.

If T is a complete sufficient statistic for θ and E(g(T)) = τ(θ) then g(T) is the uniformly minimum-variance unbiased estimator (UMVUE) of τ(θ).

Statement

Let  be a random sample from a distribution that has p.d.f (or p.m.f in the discrete case)  where  is a parameter in the parameter space. Suppose  is a sufficient statistic for θ, and let  be a complete family. If  then  is the unique MVUE of θ.

Proof

Now we show that this function is unique. Suppose  is another candidate MVUE estimator of θ. Then

Since  is a complete family

and therefore the function  is the unique function of Y with variance not greater than that of any other unbiased estimator. We conclude that  is the MVUE.

Example for when using a non-complete minimal sufficient statistic 

An example of an improvable Rao–Blackwell improvement, when using a minimal sufficient statistic that is not complete, was provided by Galili and Meilijson in 2016. Let  be a random sample from a scale-uniform distribution  with unknown mean  and known design parameter .

However, the following unbiased estimator can be shown to have lower variance: 

 

And in fact, it could be even further improved when using the following estimator:  

The model is a scale model. Optimal equivariant estimators can then be derived for loss functions that are invariant.

See also
Basu's theorem
Complete class theorem
Rao–Blackwell theorem

References

Theorems in statistics
Estimation theory